Coleophora albotitae is a moth of the family Coleophoridae that is endemic to Turkey.

References

External links

albotitae
Endemic fauna of Turkey
Moths described in 1936
Moths of Asia